The Captaincy General was a division of a viceroyalty in Spanish or Portuguese colonial administration. Captaincies general were established districts that were under threat from foreign invasion or Indian attack.  Their governors were the Captains general. 

Spanish captaincies general, on account of their independence and distance from the crown, became virtual viceroyalties, having a direct relationship with the king and the Council of the Indies, in Madrid.

Notes

See also
Captain-major
Captain general
Captaincy
Captaincies of the Spanish Empire
Captaincies of the Portuguese Empire
Captaincies of Brazil